The Other is a fictional character in the British science fiction franchise Doctor Who. A legendary figure in Time Lord history, the Other is only alluded to in the television series, but is featured several times in spin-off media based on the programme.

Character development
The Other was intended to be part of the backstory of the television series during the Seventh Doctor's tenure and part of script editor Andrew Cartmel's intention now known to fans as the "Cartmel Masterplan" to restore some mystery to the character of the Doctor. Cartmel felt that years of explanations about the Doctor's origins and the Time Lords had removed much of the mystery and strength of the character of the Doctor, and decided to make the Doctor "once again more than a mere chump of a Time Lord". Elements of this effort were liberally scattered through Seasons 25 and 26 of the series, and occasionally included hints about the Doctor's past; for example, in Silver Nemesis, when Ace and the Doctor discuss the creation of validium, the Doctor mentions that it was created by Omega and Rassilon. Ace asks, "And...?" and the Doctor is silent. Cartmel has written that this was meant to indicate that the Doctor was "more than a Time Lord":
In the same story, Lady Peinforte's lines about the Doctor's "secrets" were also intended as a gesture towards this backstory.

The suspension of the Doctor Who television series in 1989 meant that the "master plan" never paid off on screen.  Elements of it, however, were used as part of the background for the Virgin New Adventures line of original Doctor Who novels. Eventually, most of the details were revealed in the last Seventh Doctor New Adventure, Lungbarrow by Marc Platt. In the afterword, Platt discusses the Other, stating that he "may not even be Gallifreyan himself" and writing:

A line in Lungbarrow says that the Other came to Rassilon "on approval", implying that Rassilon "acquired" him "in some sort of pact with God knows what". At the end of the novel, the Doctor learns that Leela is pregnant with Andred's child, and asks her to name it after him; Platt explained that this was meant to suggest a time loop in which the hybrid child goes on to become the Other, explaining the Doctor's half-human parentage in the 1996 TV film.

Fictional biography

The Other first appears in flashbacks in Ben Aaronovitch's Remembrance of the Daleks novelisation. He co-founds Time Lord society with Rassilon and Omega following their overthrow of the cult of Pythia, which had previously dominated Gallifrey. The Other cautions the others not to use time travel to "impose order", and later witnesses Omega's apparent death as he conducts experiments on a star.

Of the three, the Other's origins are the most obscure, with the circumstances of his birth and appearance being a mystery. Like Rassilon, various contradictory legends surround the Other, some hinting that he had powers surpassing that of Rassilon or Omega, and some even suggesting that he was not born on the Time Lords' home world of Gallifrey. Even his name is lost to time, which is why he is simply referred to as "the Other". A minor Gallifreyan festival known as Otherstide is celebrated yearly in his honour. This festival falls on the same days as the Doctor's name day.

When the Pythia was overthrown, she laid a final curse on Gallifrey that made the population sterile. To ensure the continuation of their race, Rassilon created the Looms, machines that would "weave" new Gallifreyans out of extant genetic material.

Omega apparently died creating the black hole which provided the raw power needed for time travel, turning the Gallifreyans into Lords of Time. (Some accounts suggest that Rassilon misled Omega into believing he would survive this mission.) Rassilon and the Other were left to pick up the pieces, with Rassilon harnessing the nucleus of the black hole to create the Eye of Harmony and becoming virtual dictator of Time Lord civilisation. As Rassilon's rule became more oppressive, the Other knew that his own days were numbered.

The Other first ensured that his granddaughter Susan (the last child to be naturally born on Gallifrey) was safe, sending her to the spaceport to get off the planet. Then, in a last gesture of defiance against Rassilon's rule, he committed suicide by throwing himself into the Looms, mixing his genetic material into the banks.

Eons passed, and the Looms became integrated into the great Houses of Gallifrey. Eventually, a new Cousin was born to the House of Lungbarrow, who would become known as the Doctor. Disenchanted with Time Lord society, the Doctor stole a TARDIS, intending to explore the universe. However, inside he discovered that the Hand of Omega, the stellar manipulator Omega had used to create the Eye of Harmony, had followed him on board, somehow recognising inside him one of its creators.  Although time travel into Gallifrey's past was strictly forbidden, the Hand overrode the locks that prevented the TARDIS from doing so and took the Doctor back to the Old Time.

There, a year after the Other had vanished into the Looms, the Doctor found Susan wandering the streets of the city — she had never made it to the spaceport. Like the Hand, although the Doctor did not look anything like the Other, Susan recognised that there was a connection, and when she addressed him as "Grandfather", both of them knew that it was somehow right. The implication was that the Other had been genetically reincarnated as the Doctor, although how much of the Other is in the Doctor and how much he remembers of his past life, if at all, is unclear. Susan and the Doctor then left in the TARDIS to travel through time and space. These events are seemingly contradicted by "The Name of the Doctor", which portrays the First Doctor and Susan entering the TARDIS together.

More information about the Other is revealed or implied in the Virgin Missing Adventures novel Cold Fusion, by Lance Parkin. In this novel, the Fifth Doctor encounters a Gallifreyan woman, whom he dubs Patience (though her real name is never said), who it is implied is the Other's wife. She appears again in Parkin's BBC novel The Infinity Doctors, where she was once married to that novel's version of the Doctor, who may be separate from normal continuity. She is a naturally born Gallifreyan, who is apparently immortal, barring accidents, and has lived for over two million years. She was first married to Omega and then to the Other or the Doctor and they had 13 children. In flash back, the description of her husband matches one of the faces seen during the mindbending contest in The Brain of Morbius, specifically the one represented by an image of Douglas Camfield. At some point, the Lord President turned against her family, as they were naturally born, rather than from a loom, and ordered the Chancellory Guard to kill them all. Somehow the First Doctor was able to help her escape in a prototype TARDIS. How this account fits with the information on the Other given above is deliberately kept vague and in some cases appears to contradict it.  Lance Parkin has indicated that the reason for the contradictions is that he was working from a different version of the Cartmel Masterplan than the version used by Marc Platt when writing Lungbarrow.

A possible origin for the Other is provided by Human Nature, a 1995 Virgin New Adventures novel by Paul Cornell. In the novel, the Doctor transforms himself into John Smith, a human with only fragmentary memories of his past life. Smith writes a children's story about an old man in Victorian England who invents a police box larger on the inside and capable of travel through time and space. Lonely, the man visits the planet Gallifrey, where he finds a primitive tribe. He tells the Gallifreyans about science and the arts, teaches them to travel time and space, and advises them on how to be as civilised and law-abiding as England. When they grow dull and officious, he invents a way for them to begin new lives upon death, and gives them second hearts in hopes of making them more joyful. When this fails, he steals a police box and flees back to Earth, deciding that being free is better than being in charge. Smith's story was plotted by Cornell's friend Steven Moffat; Cornell stated, "He's always had some radical thoughts about Who, and it was good to be able to give expression to some of them."

An alternative theory for The Other was provided in 2017 by Titan Comics in crossover event “The Lost Dimension”. In this story the Eleventh Doctor travels back to ancient Gallifrey by mistake where he meets Rassilon. The Doctor introduces himself as “the other one” and Rassilon consequently calls him “The Other”. The Doctor thus becomes one of the most important figures in Gallifreyan history when he is the first person to fly in a TARDIS.

See also
History of the Time Lords

References

External links

Doctor Who book characters
Doctor Who Doctors
Television characters introduced in 1990
Fictional extraterrestrial–human hybrids
Fictional suicides
Male characters in literature
Fictional characters without a name